Fiji has been participating at the Deaflympics since 2005. 

Fiji has competed at the Summer Deaflympics on three occasions in 2005, 2009 and 2013..

Medal tallies

Summer Deaflympics

Athletes in the Summer Deaflympics 
2005: Apenisa Matairavula, Makarita Miriama, Mesake Qionilase, Venaslo Tamanai, (Athletics), Wani Baniakau, Serupepeli Bukatavo, Michael Din, Mosese Kama, Apenisa Matairavula, Senetiki Nasave, Sireli Naserua, Alipate Qio, Serevi Rokotuibau, Josefa Sokovagone, Jone Temo, Epeli Vualili, Jeremaia Vueti (Volleyball)
2009: Koronawa Gukibau, Mosese Kama, Manasa Narita, Rupeni Naulumatua, Napoleon Ratu, Josefa Sokovagone, Epeli Vualili (Volleyball)
2013:  Ratu Raravisa (Athletics), Vivienne Bale, Philip Wing (Table Tennis)

See also 
 Fiji at the Olympics
 Fiji at the Paralympics

References 

 Fiji at the Deaflympics 

Nations at the Deaflympics